Binary Ninja is a reverse-engineering platform developed by Vector 35 Inc. It can disassemble a binary and display the disassembly in linear or graph views. It performs automated in-depth analysis of the code, generating information that helps to analyze a binary. It lifts the instructions into intermediate languages, and eventually generates the decompiled code.  

Binary Ninja supports various CPU architectures and binary executable formats. It runs on Windows, macOS, and Linux. It also has a free-to-use cloud version.

History 
Binary Ninja was originally an internal tool for a CTF team. The developers later decided to form Vector 35 Inc and develop Binary Ninja into a commercial product. The development started in 2015 and the first public version was released in July 2016. 

The commercial product does not share code with the internal tool. The latter one is now open-sourced under GPLv2.

Features and usage

User interface 
Binary Ninja's UI is built using Qt. Its main UI comprises a symbol list, a cross-reference window, a linear/graph view of the disassembly, a mini-graph, as well as a feature map. It can also show a hex editor, strings listing, and a triage view.    

Binary Ninja generates extensive annotations in the UI to assist binary analysis.    

Binary Ninja also supports user-defined themes.

API and plugins 
Binary Ninja offers an API that can be accessed via Python, C++, or Rust. The API is open-sourced under MIT License. It can interact with most of the Binary Ninja's functionality,  e.g., user interface, analysis, IL (see below), etc. It can be used to add support for new architecture or automate tasks. 

Plugins can be made via the API to enhance Binary Ninja. Vector35 maintains a collection of official plugins, while the community has created numerous community plugins.   

Some notable plugins are the debugger, the signature kit, etc.

Binary Ninja intermediate languages (BNIL) 
Binary Ninja offers three intermediate languages (ILs).  

 The low-level IL (LLIL) is a verbose lifting of the underlying instructions from various architectures to a unified representation.  
 The medium-level IL (MLIL) creates variables with types and removes the notion of the stack.
 The high-level IL (HLIL, also called decompiler) offers a representation of the code that is similar to C source code.

Core analysis 
Binary Ninja automatically performs various analyses on the binary. Some examples are: 

 function detection 
 cross-references for code and data 
 type inference 
 constant propagation 
 value-set analysis 
 jump table resolution

Binary editing and patching, shellcode compiler (SCC) 
Binary Ninja offers binary patching and editing features. It can assemble an instruction at the current line, flip a conditional jump, etc. Edits and updated analysis are immediately reflected in the UI. 

Binary Ninja can be used as a general binary editor. It supports several commonly-used transformations and encryption algorithms. 

The shellcode compiler allows the user to compile and insert code via C syntax.

Supported architectures and executable file formats

Architectures 
Binary Ninja supports the following CPU architectures officially:

 x86 32-bit
 x86 64-bit
 ARMv7
 Thumb2
 ARMv8
 PowerPC
 MIPS
 6502

The support for these architectures vary and details can be found in the official FAQ. 

Community-authored plugins add support for various other architectures.

Executable file formats 
Binary Ninja supports the following executable file formats officially:

 PE/COFF
 ELF
 Mach-O
 .NES binary (via a plugin)
 Raw binary

See also 

 Ghidra
 JEB
 Radare2
 Interactive Disassembler
 Decompiler
 Disassembler

References 

Disassemblers